Justin Cabassol (1800 - 19 January 1873) was a French songwriter and poet.

References

1800 births
1873 deaths
Writers from Paris
French songwriters
Male songwriters
French male poets
19th-century French poets
19th-century male musicians
19th-century musicians